The 2023 Women's EuroHockey Championship Qualifiers will be a series of 4 qualification events for the 2023 EuroHockey Championships in Mönchengladbach. The tournaments will be held in England, Ireland, Lithuania and France between 15 and 27 August 2022.

The top team from each tournament will qualify for the EuroHockey Championships. The second and third ranked teams from each group will advance to the EuroHockey Championship II, with the remaining teams advancing to the EuroHockey Championship III.

Qualification
All eligible teams from the EuroHockey Championships II and III will participate, as well as the four lowest ranked teams from the EuroHockey Championships.

Qualifier A
Qualifier A will be held in Durham, England.

Standings

Results

Qualifier B
Qualifier B will be held in Dublin, Ireland.

Standings

Results

Qualifier C
Qualifier C will be held in Vilnius, Lithuania.

Preliminary round

Final

Qualifier D
Qualifier D will be held in Dunkirk, France.

Standings

Results

Goalscorers

See also
 2023 Men's EuroHockey Championship Qualifiers

References

Qualifiers
Qualifiers
International women's field hockey competitions hosted by England
International women's field hockey competitions hosted by France
International women's field hockey competitions hosted by Ireland
International women's field hockey competitions hosted by Lithuania
EuroHockey Championship Qualifiers